Sekolah Berasrama Penuh (SBP) or Fully Residential School is a school system established in Malaysia to nurture outstanding students to excel in academics and extracurricular activities. Since 2008, SBPs are directly administered by Fully Residential and Excellent Schools Management Division, Ministry of Education.

History
SBP began in 1890, with Richard Olaf Winstedt as deputy (he later became Director of Education in Malaya). "The Selangor Raja School" was established as an English-mediated educational initiative to educate the Malay elites such as the members of the royal families in various Malayan states. In 1894, the school was closed for renovation and was reopened in 1905 at Kuala Kangsar, to this day known as the Malay College Kuala Kangsar (MCKK).

Sultan Idris Shah I of Perak, in the Conference of Rulers (Durbar) in 1903, criticised the policy of British administration, especially in the education of the Malays, saying it was merely "to produce better Malay farmers or fishermen only". Sultan of Perak himself has offered on-site locations for MCKK, with the purpose "for the education of the Malays of good family and for the training of Malay boys for admission to certain branches of the government service". In 1947, "Malay Girl College" was established in Kuala Lumpur, later moved to Seremban, Negeri Sembilan, known as Tunku Kurshiah College until now, named after the first Raja Permaisuri Agong.

In September 1955, an Education Committee was established which led to the conception of the Razak Report in 1956. Razak Report approved and produced the Education Ordinance 1957. The Razak Report recommended the formation of six units of Sekolah Berasrama Penuh (SBP), namely Sekolah Dato 'Abdul Razak (1956), Sekolah Tun Fatimah (1956), Sekolah Tuanku Abdul Rahman (1957), Sekolah Menengah Sultan Abdul Halim (1963), Sekolah Sultan Alam Shah (1963) and Sekolah Seri Puteri (1968).

In 1955, Kolej Islam Malaya was embodied in the former palace on the site, which was donated by Sultan Hisamuddin in Klang, Selangor. In 1966, the college was moved to Jalan Universiti in Petaling Jaya, Selangor. In 1967, after the customisation work was completed, the college relocated to Klang and was named Kolej Islam Klang. In 1972, the college administration was taken over entirely by the Ministry of Education and the name was changed to Kolej Islam Sultan Alam Shah.

Between 1973 and 1975, 10 SBPs were built. The projects that needed to be implemented in the Second Malaysia Plan were stated as "important projects in the plan is the establishment of ten pilot residential science secondary schools added to provide educational opportunities for pupils from rural areas to pursue their education in science subjects."

To date, Malaysia has 69 SBPs: 11 premier schools, 43 science secondary schools, 12 integrated SBPs and 3 federal Islamic secondary school. 6 of SBPs are all-boys and another 6 are all-girls. The latest SBP opened in Malaysia was Gua Musang Science Secondary School. The 69th SBP in Malaysia was opened in 2014. A number of SBPs are currently either under planning or ongoing construction under Eleventh Malaysia Plan.

Traditions
The history of SBP is a rich one, and certain fields are considered the hallmark of SBP schools. These include:
 Fully Residential School Excellence Day (Hari Kecemerlangan SBP, HKSBP)
 Prime Minister's Trophy Debate Championship (Pertandingan Bahas ala Parlimen Piala Perdana Menteri, PPM)
 SBP Wind Orchestra Competition
 SBP 7's Rugby Annual Championship
 Islamic Leadership Conference (Nadwah Kepimpinan Islam, NKI)
 Malaysia International Young Inventors Olympiad (MIYIO)
 Fully Residential Schools' International Symposium (FRSIS)
 Malay Gamelan and Caklempong Competition

List of fully residential schools in Malaysia 
As in 2018, Malaysia has 70 fully residential schools which are later divided into five zones, namely Northern Zone, Central Zone, Southern Zone, Eastern Zone and SQL Zone.

See also 
 Education in Malaysia
 MARA Junior Science College

References

External links
 

 
Secondary schools in Malaysia
Schools in Malaysia
Boarding schools in Malaysia
1890 establishments in British Malaya
Education policy in Malaysia